Onome Sympson Sodje (born 17 July 1988) is a Nigerian footballer who plays as a striker. He has played professionally for clubs in England, Slovakia, Malta, Vietnam, Algeria and Albania.

Career
Born in Warri, Delta State, Sodje came through the Charlton Athletic youth system|. He scored 14 goals in 19 games in the 2003–04 U17 FA Premier Academy League. He spent time on loan at Welling United towards the end of the 2004–05 season. He then went out on loan to Conference National team Gravesend & Northfleet in September 2005. He rejoined Gravesend for a second loan period in February 2006.

He was released by Charlton in 2006 and eventually signed for Gravesend & Northfleet permanently in August.

Sodje signed for fellow Conference Premier club York City on 18 June 2007 on a free transfer. He was joint top goalscorer with 17 goals in the 2007–08 season. Sodje won the first Conference Premier Goal of the Month award in September 2008 with a goal against Torquay United, which won with 30% of the vote. He came on as a 63rd minute substitute in the FA Trophy Final at Wembley Stadium on 9 May 2009, which York lost 2–0 to Stevenage Borough. He was largely restricted to the bench as his form dipped during the 2008–09 season, which he finished with 46 appearances and seven goals.

Sodje signed for Championship team Barnsley on 15 June 2009. He was allowed to move on a free transfer as he was playing at York on a non-contract basis. His contract status was due to his lack of a valid work permit, connected to an ongoing dispute with immigration officials over his right to reside in the UK. York spent £5,000 on legal fees to fight his case which also attracted the support of the Archbishop of York John Sentamu and MP Hugh Bayley. After winning the right to stay in the country he chose to move to Barnsley rather than sign the contract offered by York.

He made his debut as a 79th-minute substitute in a 2–0 defeat to Coventry City on 15 August. He joined Conference Premier leaders Oxford United on an emergency loan on 23 November and made his debut a day later as a substitute in a 1–0 victory over Forest Green Rovers. He scored his first goal in a 1–1 with Salisbury City, which put Oxford in the lead on 79 minutes. Oxford confirmed his loan would not be extended in January 2010. He joined Slovak Superliga team FK Senica in January, scoring a header on his debut in a 2–1 victory over MFK Ružomberok in February. Sodje finished the 2009–10 season with one goal in 13 appearances. He made only appearance in the 2010–11 season, in a 0–0 draw at MŠK Žilina on 21 August. He later signed with Vietnamese First Division club Đồng Nai. Sodje joined Floriana of the Maltese Premier League in December and scored on his debut, a 4–2 victory over Ħamrun Spartans. In July 2012, he joined Algerian club CR Belouizdad, signing a three-year contract. He scored one goal in 13 games in the Algerian Ligue Professionnelle 1, before being released at the end of the season.

Following his release from Belouizdad, Sodje signed for Albanian Superliga club Partizani Tirana. Sodje scored on his debut for Partizani Tirana on 18 September 2013, in their 2–2 draw against Bylis Ballsh.

In October 2014 he returned to England, signing for Nuneaton Town.

Sodje joined Billericay Town for the 2015–16 season, scoring 7 goals for the club.

Personal life
He moved to England at the age of 14 and attended Sedgehill School in south-east London. Sodje's uncles, Sam, Efe, Akpo, and Steve all play football in England as well. Another uncle Bright is a former professional rugby league footballer.

Career statistics

A.  The "League" column constitutes appearances and goals (including those as a substitute) in the Football League, Football Conference and Slovak Superliga.
B.  The "Other" column constitutes appearances and goals (including those as a substitute) in the Conference League Cup and FA Trophy.

References

External links

1988 births
Living people
Sportspeople from Warri
Nigerian footballers
Nigerian expatriate footballers
Association football forwards
Charlton Athletic F.C. players
Welling United F.C. players
Ebbsfleet United F.C. players
York City F.C. players
Barnsley F.C. players
Oxford United F.C. players
FK Senica players
Dong Nai FC players
Floriana F.C. players
CR Belouizdad players
FK Partizani Tirana players
Nuneaton Borough F.C. players
Billericay Town F.C. players
National League (English football) players
English Football League players
Slovak Super Liga players
Maltese Premier League players
Algerian Ligue Professionnelle 1 players
Kategoria Superiore players
Expatriate footballers in Albania
Expatriate footballers in Algeria
Expatriate footballers in England
Expatriate footballers in Malta
Expatriate footballers in Slovakia
Expatriate footballers in Vietnam
Nigerian expatriate sportspeople in Albania
Nigerian expatriate sportspeople in Algeria
Nigerian expatriate sportspeople in England
Nigerian expatriate sportspeople in Malta
Nigerian expatriate sportspeople in Slovakia
Nigerian expatriate sportspeople in Vietnam